Cadwalader by itself most often refers to
Cadwalader, Wickersham & Taft, the oldest continuously running law firm in the United States, and named in part after John Lambert Cadwalader (1836–1914), an American lawyer and politician.
Cadwalader's Ice Cream, a chain of ice cream parlours across Wales

As a given name, it may also refer to

Cadwaladr, King of Gwynedd from  655 to 682
Cædwalla of Wessex, King of Wessex from 685 until 688
Cadwaladr ap Gruffydd (12th century), brother of Owain Gwynedd

People with the given name
Cadwalader Evans (1762–1841), American politician
Cadwalader Morris (1741–1795), American politician
Cadwalader Ringgold (1802–1867), American naval officer and explorer

People with the surname
 Beatrix Cadwalader Farrand (born 1872), United States, Landscape Gardener
Gardner Cadwalader (born 1948), United States Olympic rower
George Cadwalader (1806–1879), general in the United States Army
John Cadwalader (1805–1879), American lawyer, jurist, and politician from Philadelphia, Pennsylvania
John Cadwalader (1742–1786), American merchant and soldier from Philadelphia, Pennsylvania
John Lambert Cadwalader (1836–1914), lawyer from Pennsylvania, assistant U.S. secretary of state
Lambert Cadwalader (1742–1823), American merchant and leader in New Jersey and Pennsylvania
Thomas Cadwalader (1708–1799), American physician in Philadelphia
Thomas McCall Cadwalader (1795–1873), American military general
Betsi Cadwaladr (1789–1860), Welsh nurse

Places
Cadwalader Beach, New Zealand
Cadwalader Heights, Trenton, New Jersey, United States
Cadwalader Inlet, Antarctica
Cadwalader Park, Trenton, New Jersey, United States

Other
Cadwaladerite, a mineral

See also
Cadwaladr (name)
Cadwallader (name)
Cadwallader (disambiguation)